The 2019 season was Stabæk's sixth season back in the Eliteserien following their relegation in 2012 and their 23rd season in the top flight of Norwegian football. Stabæk finished the season in 8th position and were knocked out of the Norwegian Cup by Viking in the Fourth Round.

Season events
On 6 June, manager Henning Berg left the club to become manager of AC Omonia, with Jan Jönsson being announced as his replacement on 11 June.
|15th

Squad

Transfers

In

Loans in

Out

Loans out

Released

Competitions

Eliteserien

Results summary

Results by round

Results

Table

Norwegian Cup

Squad statistics

Appearances and goals

|-
|colspan="14"|Players away from Stabæk on loan:
|-
|colspan="14"|Players who left Stabæk during the season:

|}

Goal scorers

Disciplinary record

References

Stabæk Fotball seasons
Stabæk